Pursuit (2003) is a science fiction novel by authors Andy Mangels and Michael A. Martin which conclude the events of the television series Roswell. The series had ended in somewhat of a cliffhanger, with the main characters on the run from an evil subunit of the FBI. Pursuit and Turnabout conclude this story arc, although there are other plot elements that remain a possibility for future narratives.

2003 American novels
American science fiction novels